The 2 miles was a track cycling event held as part of the Cycling at the 1904 Summer Olympics programme.  It was the only time this  event was held at the Olympics.  13 American cyclists competed.

Results

Final

References

Sources

 

Cycling at the 1904 Summer Olympics
Track cycling at the 1904 Summer Olympics
Olympic track cycling events